Pagyda discolor is a moth in the family Crambidae. It was described by Swinhoe in 1894. It is found in India (Assam) and Burma.

References

Moths described in 1894
Pyraustinae